The Jewish Cemetery of Ponta Delgada is a Jewish cemetery located in Ponta Delgada, Azores.

Here is buried Mimom ben Abraham Abohbot, founder of the Synagogue Ets Haim in Angra do Heroísmo.

See also
 Jewish Cemetery of Funchal

References

Cemeteries in Portugal
Jewish cemeteries in Portugal
Judaism in the Azores